The 5th Special Operations Squadron is part of the 919th Special Operations Wing. The 5th is based at Hurlburt Field, Florida. It operates U-28 aircraft providing special operations capability.

Mission
The 5th Special Operations Squadron provides an Instructor cadre for the Air Force Special Operations Air Warfare Center's U-28, AC-130J, MC-130H, C-146 and Combat Aviation Advisor programs. It also provides intratheater support to Special Operations Forces worldwide in support of National Command Authorities taskings.

The 5th Special Operations Squadron at Hurlburt Field, Fla., is a Total Force Integration unit whose members participate in the Active Duty mission of the Air Force Special Operations Air Warfare Center at Hurlburt. While 5th SOS members perform duty at Hurlburt as part of AFSOWC, the squadron administratively falls under the 919th Special Operations Wing, a USAF Reserve unit headquartered at Duke Field, Fla.

History

World War II
The 5th Combat Cargo Squadron was constituted on 25 April 1944, and activated on 1 May at Syracuse Army Air Base, assigned to the 2d Combat Cargo Group. It was equipped with Curtiss C-46 Commando and Douglas C-47 Skytrain transport aircraft. Between 9 and 27 October it was located at Baer Field for overseas processing following the completion of its training. It arrived at Biak in November, flying passengers and cargo to American bases in Australia, New Guinea, the Admiralties, and the Philippines. The unit was also involved in the airdrop of supplies to American and guerrilla forces in the Philippines. The 5th moved forward to Dulag on Leyte in May 1945. It continued flights to bases in Australia, New Guinea, and the Philippines, and transported personnel and supplies to the Ryukyus, evacuating casualties on the return flights. On 16 August, the day after Japan surrendered, the squadron moved to Okinawa, transporting occupation forces personnel and equipment to Japan and ferrying liberated prisoners of war to the Philippines. In September, the 5th Combat Cargo Squadron relocated to Yokota Air Base, where it was inactivated on 15 January 1946 and disbanded on 8 October 1948.

Vietnam war

The second predecessor of the squadron was organized as the 5th Air Commando Squadron at Nha Trang Air Base, South Vietnam in August 1965.  It conducted psychological operations and humanitarian programs during the Vietnam War until it was inactivated in October 1969.

Air Force Reserve
The two squadrons were consolidated as the 5th Special Operations Squadron in 1985, but remained inactive.  In 1994, the squadron was activated in the reserves at Duke Field, Florida, 919th Special Operations Wing.  It has trained for special operations, Air refueling of special operations helicopters, and resupply missions, using modified C-130 aircraft from 1995 to 2008. The 5th has periodically deployed to support special operations contingency operations worldwide.  Since late 2007. it has provided instructors for active duty students training to operate Pilatus U-28 aircraft.

Operations

Vietnam War

Operation Enduring Freedom

Operation Iraqi Freedom

Lineage
 5th Combat Cargo Squadron
 Constituted as the 5th Combat Cargo Squadron on 25 April 1944
 Activated on 1 May 1944
 Inactivated on 15 January 1946
 Disbanded on 8 October 1948 
 Reconstituted and consolidated with the 5th Special Operations Squadron as the 5th Special Operations Squadron on 19 September 1985

 5th Special Operations Squadron
 Constituted as the 5th Air Commando Squadron (Psychological Operation) and activated on 2 August 1965 (not organized)
 Organized on 8 August 1965
 Redesignated 5th Special Operations Squadron on 1 August 1968
 Inactivated on 15 October 1969
 Consolidated with the 5th Combat Cargo Squadron on 19 September 1985
 Activated 1 December 1994, Air Force Reserve Command at Duke Field, Eglin AFB Base. Aircraft used was MC-130N/P tankers.

Assignments
 2d Combat Cargo Group, 1 May 1944 – 15 January 1946
 Pacific Air Forces, 2 August 1965 (not organized)
 2d Air Division, 8 August 1965
 14th Air Commando Wing (later 14th Special Operations Wing), 8 March 1966 – 15 October 1969
 919th Operations Group (later 919th Special Operations Group), 1 December 1994
 492d Special Operations Wing, c. 10 May 2017 – present

Stations
 Syracuse Army Air Base, New York, 1 May 1944
 Baer Field, Indiana, 9–27 October 1944
 Biak, Netherlands East Indies, November 1944
 Dulag Airfield, Leyte, Philippines, 15 May 1945
 Okinawa, 16 August 1945
 Yokota Air Base, Japan, September 1945 – 15 January 1946
 Nha Trang Air Base, South Vietnam, 8 August 1965
 Tuy Hoa Air Base, South Vietnam, 5 September - 15 October 1969
 Duke Field, Florida, 1 December 1994
 Eglin Air Force Base, Florida, 1 October 1999
 Hurlburt Field, Florida, 26 January 2009 – present

Aircraft

 Curtiss C-46 Commando (1944–1945)
 Douglas C-47 Skytrain (1944–1945)
 Helio U-10 Courier (1965–1969)
 Lockheed MC-130P Combat Shadow (1994–2008)
 Pilatus U-28A (2008–present)
 Lockheed MC-130H Combat Talon II (2015–2008)
 Lockheed AC-130U Spooky II (2013–2008)

References

Notes

Bibliography

External links

 
 

Military units and formations in Florida
005